Kathleen Jansen is a judge of the Michigan Court of Appeals.

She has degrees from Michigan State University and the University of Detroit Law School.

Prior to her appointment to the appeals court in 1989 she served on the Macomb County Circuit Court.  She also earlier served on the Macomb County Probate Court.  When she was elected to that court in 1984 she became the first woman to serve on it.

References

Sources
appeals court bio of Jansen 

Living people
Michigan State University alumni
University of Detroit Mercy alumni
Michigan state court judges
American women judges
People from Macomb County, Michigan
Year of birth missing (living people)
21st-century American women